Marcel Avdić (born 28 February 1991) is a German professional footballer who plays as a midfielder. He has played in the 3. Liga and in the Romanian Liga I.

References

External links
 

1991 births
Living people
German footballers
Association football midfielders
3. Liga players
Regionalliga players
Liga I players
SpVgg Unterhaching players
Kickers Offenbach players
SV Waldhof Mannheim players
ASC Oțelul Galați players
FC Gießen players
SSV Reutlingen 05 players
German expatriate footballers
German expatriate sportspeople in Romania
Expatriate footballers in Romania
Footballers from Stuttgart